The following is a list of pipeline accidents in the United States in 2019. It is one of several lists of U.S. pipeline accidents. See also list of natural gas and oil production accidents in the United States.

Incidents 
This is not a complete list of all pipeline accidents. For natural gas alone, the Pipeline and Hazardous Materials Safety Administration (PHMSA), a United States Department of Transportation agency, has collected data on more than 3,200 accidents deemed serious or significant since 1987.

A "significant incident" results in any of the following consequences:

 fatality or injury requiring in-patient hospitalization
 $50,000 or more in total costs, measured in 1984 dollars
 liquid releases of five or more barrels (42 US gal/barrel)
 releases resulting in an unintentional fire or explosion

PHMSA and the National Transportation Safety Board (NTSB) post incident data, and results of investigations, into accidents involving pipelines that carry a variety of products, including natural gas, oil, diesel fuel, gasoline, kerosene, jet fuel, carbon dioxide, and other substances. Occasionally pipelines are repurposed to carry different products.

 On January 17, a natural gas and oil explosion occurred, resulting in the loss of 1.4 million dollars worth of natural gas and oil and a fire lasting all day in Watford city, North Dakota. There were no injuries or deaths.
 On January 18, an Enbridge natural gas pipeline exploded in Noble County, Ohio, causing two people to be injured along with damage to two homes.
 On January 29, a pipeline ruptured near the town of Lumberport in Harrison County, West Virginia. The rupture was located at a girth weld of an elbow on the 12-inch interstate pipeline. The root cause investigation concluded that a landslide about 150 yards from the rupture moved the pipeline approximately 10 feet from its original location, causing excessive stress on the pipe that resulted in the rupture.
 On January 30, a crude oil spill caused by an apparent open valve occurred in Enid, Oklahoma. This incident resulted in the release of 750 barrels, or 31,500 gallons, of oil into the environment, which extended five miles down a creek.
 On February 2, a fire was intentionally set in Pittsylvania county, Virginia. This fire caused $500,000  worth of damage to mountain valley pipeline construction. There were no injuries or deaths.
 On February 6, a natural gas release caused a fire in San Francisco, California. This fire lead to the evacuation of approximately 100 people in the area.
 On February 6, an oil spill occurred in St. Charles County, Missouri. This oil spill resulted in the release of 43 barrels, or 1800 gallons.
 On March 3, an Energy Transfer Partners 30-inch natural gas pipeline exploded and burned, destroying a house that was under construction previously in Audrain County, Missouri. There were no deaths, and no one was injured. The cause was Stress Corrosion Cracking. After the failure, during hydrostatic testing of this pipeline, four other sections of pipeline failed. It is estimated that 91,719 cubic feet of natural gas were released during the incident.
 On March 4, an oil and natural gas pipeline explosion due to high pressure happened in Martin County, Texas. This explosion lead to the death of two employees.
 On March 18, an oil spill occurred due to a valve leak in Watford City, North Dakota. This occurrence resulted in 12,600 gallons of oil being released.
 On April 4, a natural gas pipeline explosion occurred, with officials unsure of the cause, in Longstreet, Louisiana. There were no injuries or deaths related to this incident.
 On April 24, a Magellan Midstream Partners pipeline was detected to be losing pressure. Investigation found a leak in the pipeline near Cottonwood, Minnesota. About 8,400 gallons of diesel fuel had leaked from the pipeline.
 On June 18, pipeline installation workers struck another gas pipeline near Highway 19 at County Road 1420 and County Street 2920 in Grady County, Oklahoma, causing a fire. One worker was injured.
 On June 23, a Crimson Pipeline line spilled about 45,000 gallons of diesel fuel in Ventura, California.
 On July 10, Phillips 66 Pipeline's 12.75-inch crude oil pipeline leaked north of Wichita Falls, Texas. The failure was in a longitudinal seam. An estimated 1,200 barrels (50,400 US gallons) were spilled.
 On August 1, an Enbridge 30-inch gas transmission pipeline exploded and burned in Stanford, Kentucky. One person was killed, and five others were injured. Five homes were destroyed and at least four were damaged in the Indian Camp mobile home park in Stanford, where the explosion occurred. Flames reached more than 300 feet and melted tar on nearby roads, officials said.
 On October 3, a pipeline that had just finished maintenance spilled between 420,000 and 630,000 gallons of diesel fuel into Turkey Creek in Miller Grove, Texas.
 On October 29, near Edinburg, North Dakota the Keystone Pipeline was shut down after leaking 190,000 gallons of crude oil onto about 4.81 acres of wetlands. The cause was defective pipe.
 On November 15, a newly installed gas pipeline exploded and burned in Pepper Pike, Ohio. There were no injuries. The Public Utilities Commission of Ohio said that a preliminary investigation revealed that a welding failure caused the rupture, which caused the explosion and fire.
 On December 5, three workers suffered severe burns in multiple explosions and a fire at an EOG Resources gas pipeline compressor site near Carpenter, Wyoming.
 On December 19, a worker was injured in a pipeline incident near Douglas, Wyoming.
 On December 19, an explosion in Philadelphia killed two people and destroyed five houses.  
 On December 19, three workers were injured during a pipeline explosion in Marshall, Texas.
 On December 21, a Williams Companies gas pipeline compressor plant in Ohio County, West Virginia exploded and burned. There were no injuries reported.

References 

Lists of pipeline accidents in the United States
2019 disasters in the United States